The Wuling Dragon was a series of cabover microvans and kei trucks made by SAIC-GM-Wuling Automobile, the Chinese joint venture with General Motors of the United States of America. The Dragon is the successor of the earlier Liuzhou Wuling LZ110, which was based on the 1977-1984 Mitsubishi Minicab.

History
Production began around 1990 after an agreement was signed with Mitsubishi to produce the 1984-1991 Mitsubishi Minicab under license, as the Liuzhou Wuling LZW 6320/6430 (bus/van versions) and LZW 1010 (pickup trucks). In 1998 the car received a facelift and became the LZW6330/6332. A seven passenger minivan called the LZW6360 was added in 2003.

The engines used were originally a Daihatsu 843 cc three-cylinder and Mitsubishi's 1,061 cc 4G82 four-cylinder (all Chinese built). Since at least 1998 the engines used are 0.8-, 1.0-, and 1.1-litre versions of the old Suzuki F8A/F10A inline fours with 35, 43, and 48 PS (26, 32, and 35 kW) respectively. Other engines have also been fitted, such as Daihatsu's 993 cc three-cylinder.

The Dragon is popular as it is of the right size for China's densely populated areas and it is cheaper than most import vehicles into China.

References

Dragon
Microvans
Kei trucks
Cab over vehicles
Cars of China